Piazza di San Macuto is a piazza in the Pigna rione of Rome. It contains the church of San Macuto, near which the obelisco Macuteo was rediscovered around 1373. This is a small obelisk, only 6.34 m high (14.52 m including its base). It was originally one of a pair at Ramesses II's Temple of Ra in Heliopolis, the other being the now much shorter Obelisco Matteiano. It was moved from there to the Temple of Isis near Santa Maria sopra Minerva in antiquity, in what is now Piazza della Minerva and after its 14th century rediscovery was re-erected east of Santa Maria in Aracoeli on the Capitoline then in the Piazza della Rotonda in 1711.

Macuto
Rome R. IX Pigna
Odonyms referring to religion